The 2009 Copa do Brasil was the 21st edition of the Copa do Brasil. It began on February 18 and ended on July 1.

Format
The tournament is played in six stages, with two teams playing a two-legged tie in each stage. In the first two rounds, if the away team wins the first match by at least a 2-goal difference, it will move towards next round. The away goals rule is also used in the Copa do Brasil. The winner will qualify to the 2010 Copa Libertadores, which prevents them from participating in next year's Copa do Brasil.

Qualified teams
The 2009 edition was contested by 64 teams. 54 clubs qualified through their respective state championship or some other competition. The number of berth given to each state (one, two, or three) is determined through CBF's state ranking. Criteria may vary, but usually state federations indicate clubs with best records in the state championships or other special competitions organized by such institutions. The remaining ten clubs qualified through CBF's club ranking. Clubs that participated in the 2009 Copa Libertadores did not take part in the competition because of scheduling conflicts.

Qualified by state championships and other competitions

1 2008 State Championship winners Palmeiras qualified to 2009 Copa Libertadores
2 2008 Copa Rio winners Nova Iguaçu withdrew.
3 2008 State Championship winners Cruzeiro qualified to 2009 Copa Libertadores.
4 2008 Taça Minas Gerais winners Tupi qualified via State Championship.
5 2008 State Championship winners Sport qualified to 2009 Copa Libertadores.
6 2008 Copa Governador João Alves winners Confiança already qualified via State Championship.
7 2008 State Championship winners Ulbra Ji-Paraná is now defunct.

Qualified by CBF club ranking

Stages 1–4
Teams that play in their home stadium in the first leg are marked with †.

Section 1

Section 2

Section 3

Section 4

Stages 5 and 6
Teams that play in their home stadium in the first leg are marked with †.

References

External links
Copa do Brasil regulations 

2009 domestic association football cups
2009
2009 Brazilian football competitions